Rachel Llanes (born April 29, 1991), also known by the Chinese name Lin Ni, is an American ice hockey player and member of the Chinese national ice hockey team. She most recently played in the 2021–22 season of the Zhenskaya Hockey League (ZhHL) with the KRS Vanke Rays.

Llanes previously played with the Boston Blades and Kunlun Red Star WIH of the Canadian Women's Hockey League (CWHL) and with the Boston Pride of the National Women's Hockey League (NWHL; renamed PHF in 2021). Llanes was the first player to ever win a championship in the CWHL, the NWHL, and the ZhHL.

Playing career
Llanes began playing hockey in her early teen years and played with the San Jose Jr. Sharks girls' travel team.

She played NCAA Division I ice hockey with the Northeastern Huskies of Hockey East from 2009 through 2013.

CWHL
Llanes played for the Boston Blades in the CWHL, winning the Clarkson Cup with the team in 2015.

NWHL
In 2015, Llanes joined the Boston Pride for the inaugural NWHL season, winning the Isobel Cup with the team. In July 2016, it was announced that Llanes would continue with the team for the 2016–17 season, with a pay increase for a one-year $12,000 contract.

Return to CWHL & ZhHL
In 2017, Llanes returned to the CWHL to sign with Kunlun Red Star (KRS) in China. She also served as the strength and conditioning coach for both KRS and the Chinese national team. She remained with the team through several significant changes, first when it merged with the Vanke Rays to become the Shenzhen KRS Vanke Rays for the 2018–19 CWHL season, and again when the team joined the ZhHL for the 2019–20 season, after the CWHL folded. In their first season as part of the ZhHL, the KRS Vanke Rays become the first non-Russian team to win the ZhHL championship and Llanes earned distinction as the first player in the history of women's hockey to win championships in the CWHL, the NWHL, and the ZhHL.

Personal life
Llanes was born on April 29, 1991, in San Jose, California. She is of Filipino heritage.

Llanes holds a degree in criminal justice and psychology from Northeastern University.

From 2014 to 2016, Llanes served as assistant coach to the Lady Knights ice hockey team of the Buckingham Browne & Nichols School in Cambridge, Massachusetts.

References

External links

1991 births
Living people
American expatriate ice hockey players in China
American expatriate ice hockey players in Russia
American sportspeople of Filipino descent
American women's ice hockey forwards
Boston Blades players
Boston Pride players
Ice hockey players at the 2022 Winter Olympics
Northeastern Huskies women's ice hockey players
Northeastern University alumni
Olympic ice hockey players of China
Premier Hockey Federation players
Shenzhen KRS Vanke Rays players